Albano Albanese (20 December 1921 – 5 December 2010) was an Italian hurdler and high jumper.

References

External links
 Albano Albenese at The-Sports.info

1921 births
2010 deaths
Italian male hurdlers
Italian male high jumpers